Bandish Projekt is the pseudonym of composer, producer, DJ and multi-instrumentalist Mayur Narvekar. Bandish Projekt is a musical act featuring a blend of Indian elements in an electronica format.  The title "Bandish Projekt" is derived from Bandish (an Indian classical composition) and "Projekt," which reflects the experimental and evolving nature of the music. Bandish Projekt was formed in 1998 by Mayur Narvekar, Udyan Sagar, and Mehir Nath Chopra. Mayur Narvekar regularly collaborates with producers and musicians on his albums, Sagar performs as Nucleya, and Chopra is a media entrepreneur, based in Dubai.

Biography 
Narvekar was raised in Ahmedabad by a family of classical musicians and arts enthusiasts.  His father and paternal uncle introduced him to the dholak at an early age.  Through his interest and talent for percussion, he was encouraged to formally learn the tabla.  Narvekar studied classical tabla with his teacher Pandit Divyang Vakil for 20 years. He went on to win the All India Radio (AIR) competition for percussion in 2000, and was honoured with the prestigious "Pt. Nikhil Ghosh Memorial Promising Artist Award" in 2001.

Inspired by the music and producers of the West, Narvekar began to add to his repertory of classical sounds.  Thus, his electronic act, Bandish Projekt, was conceived.  After graduating from St. Xaviers College, Ahmedabad, in 2000 with a BA in psychology, Narvekar decided to pursue a full-time career in music.

Career 
After several years as a live performer, composer and producer, Narvekar moved to Mumbai in 2008. Bandish Projekt’s first album, Correkt, was released in October 2009, followed by the single "Brown Skin Beauty" featuring Last Mango in Paris in 2010, and the EP "Chase" in March 2011. In December 2011, Bandish Projekt released another EP, "Lover," featuring Shaa’ir (Monica Dogra of Shaa'ir and Func), which was nominated for the 2012 MTV EMA award for Best Indian Act.

Bandish Projekt released two EPs in 2012, "I Am Not Alone" and "Correkt Remixed". Bandish Projekt's Alchemy Wins Asifa India Awards For Excellence the special Jury mention in the best animation film category.2014 Bandish Projekt receives GIMA Award (Global Indian Music Award ) for the best EDM track "TRAP"  from the Ep "I am Not Alone" .

Albums

References

Asian Underground musicians
Living people
Tabla players
Indian musical groups
Year of birth missing (living people)